Ritzau  may refer to:

People
 Erik Nicolai Ritzau, founder of Ritzau

Pther
 Ritzau, a Danish news agency